The Haut Bandama Fauna and Flora Reserve is found in Côte d'Ivoire, West Africa. It was established in 1973 and covers 123 km².

According to Marchesi et al. 1995, the estimated total number of chimpanzees in this reserve is 300 individuals.

References

Protected areas of Ivory Coast
Protected areas established in 1973
1973 establishments in Ivory Coast